Yip Pui Yin (born 6 August 1987) is a badminton player from Hong Kong.

Career 
Yip played at the 2005 World Badminton Championships in Anaheim. In the women's singles event she reached the third round after beating Laura Molina of Spain and Kanako Yonekura (11th seed) in round one and round two respectively. In the third round she was beaten by the 1st seed and reigning world champion Zhang Ning of China. 

She won the silver medal in the 2006 Asian Games after losing to fellow Hong Kong player Wang Chen in the final. In 2007, she played at the World Championships and was defeated in the third round by Zhu Lin, of China, 9–21, 21–16, 14–21. Yip made her first appearance at the 2008 Summer Olympics. In 2009, she won the gold medal in the 2009 East Asian Games when her opponent Zhou Mi retired halfway through the deciding set. She won 15-21, 21-13, 17-10.

At the 2012 London Olympics, Yip won against eighth seed Sung Ji-hyun, of South Korea, in the group stage. Then Yip went through to the final eight of the women's singles in badminton after she beat France's 16th seed Pi Hongyan by two games to one, winning 13–21, 21–13, 21–16. Yip faced China's Li Xuerui, who beat her two games to one. Her performance equalled the best performance by a Hong Kong shuttler at the Olympic Games.

Achievements

Asian Games 
Women's singles

Asian Championships 
Women's singles

East Asian Games 
Women's singles

Asian Junior Championships 
Girls' singles

Girls' doubles

BWF Grand Prix 
The BWF Grand Prix had two levels, the BWF Grand Prix and Grand Prix Gold. It was a series of badminton tournaments sanctioned by the Badminton World Federation (BWF) which was held from 2007 to 2017. The World Badminton Grand Prix sanctioned by International Badminton Federation (IBF) from 1983 to 2006.

Women's singles

  BWF Grand Prix Gold tournament
  BWF & IBF Grand Prix tournament

Record against selected opponents 
Record against year-end Finals finalists, World Championships semi-finalists, and Olympic quarter-finalists. Accurate as of 17 December 2021.

References

External links 

 BWF player profile
 YIP Pui Yin profile for the 2009 East Asian Games
 YIP Pui Yin profile for the 2012 Olympic Games

1987 births
Living people
Hong Kong female badminton players
Badminton players at the 2008 Summer Olympics
Badminton players at the 2012 Summer Olympics
Badminton players at the 2016 Summer Olympics
Olympic badminton players of Hong Kong
Badminton players at the 2006 Asian Games
Badminton players at the 2010 Asian Games
Badminton players at the 2014 Asian Games
Badminton players at the 2018 Asian Games
Asian Games medalists in badminton
Asian Games silver medalists for Hong Kong
Asian Games bronze medalists for Hong Kong
Medalists at the 2006 Asian Games
Medalists at the 2010 Asian Games
21st-century Hong Kong women